The black-faced laughingthrush (Trochalopteron affine) is a bird species in the family Leiothrichidae. 

It is found in the Eastern Himalayas.  Its range extends from eastern Nepal eastwards to Arunachal Pradesh in India and further to Myanmar, along with Bhutan and southeastern Tibet.  Small disjunct populations also exist in continental Southeast Asia.

References

External links
 Black-faced laughingthrush videos on the Internet Bird Collection
Images at ADW

black-faced laughingthrush
Birds of Eastern Himalaya
Birds of Central China
Birds of Yunnan
black-faced laughingthrush
black-faced laughingthrush
Taxonomy articles created by Polbot